Travel is the movement of people or objects between relatively distant geographical locations.

Travel(s) may also refer to:

Music
 Travel (Future of Forestry EP), 2009
 Travel (Mamamoo EP), 2020
 Travels (Defeater album), 2008
 Travels (Jake Shimabukuro album) or the title song, 2015
 Travels (Pat Metheny Group album) or the title song, 1983
 "Travels", a song by the Smashing Pumpkins from Shiny and Oh So Bright, Vol. 1 / LP: No Past. No Future. No Sun., 2018

Television
 Travel Channel, an American pay television channel
 Travel Channel International
 "Travel" (Rob & Big), a 2008 TV episode

Other uses
 Travel (basketball), or traveling, a rule violation
 Travel (magazine), later Travel Holiday, a defunct American magazine
 .travel, a top-level Internet domain
 Travel, in keyboard technology, the distance a keycap moves when pressed
 Travels (book), a 1988 non-fiction book by Michael Crichton

See also
 
 
 
 Traveler (disambiguation)
 Travelling (disambiguation)
 Journey (disambiguation)